Kwik Shop is a chain of convenience stores and gas stations located throughout Kansas, Nebraska, and Iowa. They offer cold beverages, coffee, snack items, general foods, lottery tickets, and gasoline. It is owned by EG America, which is headquartered in Westborough, MA.

History

1960s
Kwik Shop was founded as an operating division of Dillons, in 1959.

Dick Dillon, developed the Kwik Shop concept, combining the time-saving and personalized service of a small store with supermarket efficiency in management, inventory control and merchandising. In the late 1960s,  Kwik Shop expanded into a three state market area of Kansas, Nebraska, and Iowa.

1970s
In 1972, Kwik Power Gasoline was introduced, offering self-service gasoline for complete one-stop service.

In 1978, the 100th Kwik Shop opened store #629 in Bellevue, Nebraska. Kwik Shop also begins operating stores 24 hours per day. And, Kwik Shop became one of the first convenience store chains in the nation to install fountain drink equipment in its stores.

1980s
In 1980, Kwik Shop celebrates its 20th anniversary.

In 1982, Kwik Shop enters food service business with 15 stores offering fresh Sub 'N Stuff sandwiches. Plus, a new logo incorporated.

In 1983, Dillon Companies, Inc and Kwik Shop merged with Kroger Companies to become the largest food retailer in the United States.

In 1987, Kwik Shop introduces fresh hot dog roller grill offering.

1990s
In 1995, Kwik Shop celebrates its 35th anniversary.

In 1997,  a new logo was incorporated.

In 1999, Kwik Shop begins selling prepaid phone cards.

2000-present
In 2000, Kwik Shop partners with Dillons to offer Dillon Plus Shopper's Card-Fuel Discounts.

In 2001, Baker's gasoline discounts offered to Nebraska customers.

In 2002, Kwik Shop starts the Kwik Shop/United Way Golf Challenge, an annual fund-raiser golf tournament with all proceeds going to the United Way.

In 2004, Kroger launches New logo concept for all Kroger C-Stores. New Coffee Central was introduced company wide, and New Soda Central introduced company wide.

In 2005, Store 730 in Newton, Kansas is opened, the first Kwik Shop store with new Kroger image.

In 2007, Customer service is further improved with the implementation of scanning at all locations.

And in 2008, Kwik Shop partners with Dillons to allow customers to electronically redeem Fuel Frenzy fuel discounts at all Wichita area Kwik Shop stores.

In early February 2018, Kroger announced it had reached an agreement to sell its entire convenience-store portfolio including Kwik Shop to EG Group, for $2.15 billion.

References

External links
 

Kroger
1960 establishments in Kansas
Companies based in Kansas
Convenience stores of the United States
Economy of the Midwestern United States
Hutchinson, Kansas
Retail companies established in 1960
2018 mergers and acquisitions